The 2009 Asian Judo Championships were held at Taipei Arena in Taipei, Taiwan from 23 May to 24 May 2009.

Medal summary

Men

Women

Medal table

See also
 List of sporting events in Taiwan

External links
Results

Asian Championships
Asian Judo Championships
Asian Judo Championships
International sports competitions hosted by Taiwan
2000s in Taipei
Sports competitions in Taipei
Judo competitions in Taiwan